The 2019 Dubai Sevens was the first tournament within the 2019–20 World Rugby Sevens Series and was the 20th international edition and the 50th overall of the Dubai Sevens since it began in 1970. It was held on 5–7 December 2019 at The Sevens Stadium in Dubai, United Arab Emirates.

Background
The 2019 Dubai Sevens was the first of ten tournaments in the 2019–20 World Rugby Sevens Series with the tournament holding its 50th edition of the tournament with it being the 20th time that an World Series event has been held. For Ireland, they would join the series as a core team for the first time after winning the qualifier held at the 2019 Hong Kong Sevens defeating the host nation in the final by 21 points.

Throughout the off-season, qualifying for the 2020 Summer Olympics took place in the continental tournaments. Over in the Americas, Argentina and Canada qualified through to the Olympics after defeating Brazil and Jamaica respectively. The following week saw Great Britain became the eighth team to qualify after defeating France in the final at Colomiers. In early November, Australia and Kenya became the ninth and tenth team to qualify as they both won their respective regional tournaments. The final continental spot went to South Korea after defeating Hong Kong in the final of the 2019 Asia Rugby Sevens Olympic Qualifying Tournament.

Format
The sixteen are drawn into four pools of four teams. Each team plays every other team in their pool once. The top two teams from each pool advance to the Cup playoffs and compete for gold, silver and bronze medals. The other teams from each pool go to the classification playoffs for ninth to sixteenth placings.

Teams
Fifteen core teams are participating in the tournament along with one invited team, Japan:

Pool stage
All times in UAE Standard Time (UTC+4:00)

Pool A

Pool B

Pool C

Pool D

Placement matches

Fifteenth place

Thirteenth place

Eleventh place

Ninth place

Cup

Tournament placings

Source: World Rugby

Players

See also
 2019 Dubai Women's Sevens
 World Rugby Sevens Series
 2019–20 World Rugby Sevens Series

References

External links 
 Tournament site
 World Rugby info

2019
2019–20 World Rugby Sevens Series
2019 in Emirati sport
2019 in Asian rugby union
Dubai Sevens